The State were an Australian band, which formed as The Cutters. Their second single, "Real Love" (October 1988), was nominated for the 1989 ARIA Award for Best New Talent. They released their debut album, Elementary, in February 1989. After the State disbanded, all four members formed Southern Sons with Jack Jones late that year.

History 

The Cutters were formed in Melbourne by Peter Bowman on guitars and vocals (ex-Talk That Walk), Phil Buckle on vocals and guitar, and Geoff Cain on bass guitar. They were joined by Virgil Donati on drums (ex-Cloud Nine, Taste, Peter Cupples Band, the Cosy Connection) and changed their name to the State in 1987.

By 1988 the group were signed to Glenn Wheatley's label, Wheatley Bros Records, and released their debut single, "Responsible", in June. It was followed by "Real Love" in October. At the ARIA Music Awards of 1989 they were nominated for Best New Talent for "Real Love". They issued their debut album, Elementary, in February 1989.

The Ages Mike Daly observed, "[there] is some polished playing on [the album] but it is undermined by predictable material. The quartet... produce hi-tech pop dominated by Donati's hard-edged acoustic and synthesised rhythms. Buckle is an accomplished guitarist, a jazz fusion veteran like Donati, which gives this group more chops than most contemporary bands. The opener. 'Responsible', is catchy, while some flashy guitar is unleashed on 'Real Love' and 'One Step', with strong vocal back-up. But the songwriting is superficial and short on melodic hooks."

During 1989 the State supported the Eurythmics Australian tour. According to Australian musicologist, Ian McFarlane, "[their] future looked promising, but there was one vital ingredient required to make the push into the big time (i.e. a good frontman and songwriter)." The State members formed Southern Sons with American-born guitarist-vocalist, Jack Jones ( Irwin Thomas), in 1989, who became their front man. Jones "had auditioned for the band previously but was considered too young."

Band members 

 Peter Bowman – guitar, vocals
 Phil Buckle – vocals, guitar
 Geoff Cain – bass guitar
Virgil Donati – drums

Discography

Albums

Singles

Awards and nominations

ARIA Music Awards
The ARIA Music Awards is an annual awards ceremony that recognises excellence, innovation, and achievement across all genres of Australian music. They commenced in 1987.

|
|-
|rowspan="3"| 1989
| "Real Love"
| ARIA Award for Best New Talent
| 
|rowspan=3"| 
|-
| Ross Fraser for "Real Love" by The State
| ARIA Award for Producer of the Year
| 
|-
| Doug Brady for "Real Love" &  "So Lonely Now" by The State
| ARIA Award for Engineer of the Year
| 
|-

References 

Australian rock music groups
Musical groups established in 1987
Musical groups disestablished in 1989
Musical groups from Melbourne